Trento-Mattarello Airport, also known as Aeroporto G.Caproni, is an airfield located at Trentino,  south  of Trento, Italy. 

Facilities

There is an airport hotel on site Fly Bike Hotel, along with a Bar-Restaurant.

Operations

The Airport is home to numerous flying schools and clubs. Additionally the Protezione Civile has a fleet of Helicopters stationed at the airport.

Transportation

Bus
There is no direct bus service to the airport however within a 20-minute walk from the Airport Terminal (1.5km) Parcheggio Via Lidorno offers a bus service into town

Car
The airport is nestled between the SS12 and A22 roads, the latter of which connects Trento with the cities of Verona and Bolzano
Access to the airport is quick and easy from both roads

References

External links
Data

Buildings and structures in Rimini

Airports in Italy
Transport in Trentino